Cardigan (2016 pop.: 269) was a municipality that held community status in Prince Edward Island, Canada. It was a fishing community in eastern Kings County.

The community was named by Welsh farmers, later it was thought to be named after James Brudenell, 5th Earl of Cardigan, later Duke of Montague. Situated on the Cardigan River and originally named Cardigan Bridge, the community started and grew as a result of the shipbuilding industry and lumber trade.

Today the community's primary industry is manufacturing, followed by fishing, most notably lobster, mussels and clams.

The community is also home to Canada's smallest library.

On September 28, 2018, it was combined with six other municipalities to create the town of Three Rivers.

Attractions 

 Canada's Smallest Library
 Cardigan River Heritage Centre
 Shipbuilding Museum
 Clam Diggers Restaurant
 Cardigan Marina
 Cardigan Lobster Suppers
 Cardigan ball fields
 Cardigan liquor store

References

External links 
 Cardigan, Prince Edward Island Government Homepage

 

Communities in Kings County, Prince Edward Island
Former rural municipalities in Prince Edward Island
Populated places disestablished in 2018